The Legion of Super-Villains is a team of supervillains who appear in comic books published by DC Comics. They are adversaries of the Legion of Super-Heroes in the future. They first appeared as adults in Superman #147 (Aug 1961) and as teens in Adventure Comics #372 (Sept 1968).

The team originated at a time when Superman editor Mort Weisinger was consciously adding new elements to the "Superman mythos" over a period of years, building an extended cast of supporting characters who could provide new story opportunities. The creation of the Legion of Super-Heroes was part of that plan, and in the Legion's fourth appearance ("The Army of Living Kryptonite Men" in Superboy #86, Jan 1961), there's a suggestion that Lex Luthor would someday lead a group of super-villains. Seven months later, in Superman #147's story "The Legion of Super-Villains", that prediction came true.

Fictional team history
Pre-Crisis, the Legion first appears when Lex Luthor creates a radio to contact the future, hoping to send a message to a Legion of Super-Villains, feeling there must be an evil counterpart to the Legion of Super-Heroes. He is broken out of jail by a gun, flying belt, and force-field helmet being sent into his cell. He then meets the trio of villains, Cosmic King, Lightning Lord and Saturn Queen, who tell him of their origins. They cause trouble for Superman and finally an illusion cast by Saturn Queen succeeds in luring him to a planetoid, where a Kryptonite field holds him. He is told the origins of the LSV, and sentenced to death in a parody of the way the Legion of Super-Heroes voted him in, but the adult Legion of Super-Heroes appears and battles their foes. Luthor threatens to kill Superman, but Saturn Woman offers herself in his place. Superman asks for a tribute to her and is released after promising not to rescue her. He uses part of Saturn's rings to create a ring round the planetoid, causing Saturn Queen to hypnotize the villains before they can kill Saturn Woman, as it is revealed Saturn's rings somehow make the inhabitants stay good. Saturn Queen is given a fragment to make sure she stays good, and the other villains are jailed. However, they would battle Superman at other points, such as during Whatever Happened to the Man of Tomorrow?, where they aid Brainiac in assaulting Superman at his Fortress of Solitude. They also kill Lana Lang, before fleeing back to the future when Superman brutally attacks Lightning Lord.

Pre-Crisis, the Legion of Super-Villains was founded by Tarik the Mute, who had suffered irreparable damage to his vocal cords during a battle with the Science Police and subsequently developed a pathological hatred of law and order. He founded a school for supervillains, which served as the headquarters and recruiting grounds for the Legion's first incarnation, and blackmailed Colossal Boy into joining as a teacher. 

Several other incarnations of the group formed over the years, led first by Sun Emperor and then by Nemesis Kid. In the last incarnation they conquered the low-tech planet of Orando, the homeworld of Princess Projectra, and slipped it into another dimension as a base of operations. Each villain was sworn to kill one Legionnaire, but only Nemesis Kid succeeded, fatally wounding Karate Kid.

In Post-Crisis continuity, some of the members of the Legion of Super-Villains attempted to remake the universe by tampering with the origins of Superman and Batman and adopting them as their own "children", eventually transforming them into the dictators of Earth, and eliminating other members of the JLA to stop them from interfering. Superman and Batman managed to overcome their brainwashing, however, due to the Darkseid of another reality telling them what had happened; they restored the timestream to its proper course, and took the villains to the 31st century to be imprisoned, but kept the memories of their lives with the villains.

Five Years Later
During the fourth volume of Legion of Super-Heroes, the Legion of Super-Villains has disbanded, and some of its members had actually reformed. Echo joined the Legion during the Five Year Gap, but resigned after the events of Black Dawn. Lightning Lord reformed and went to work on his family's plantation on Winath. Ron-Karr joined the Legion of Substitute Heroes and Spider Girl joined the Legion, nursing some feelings for Jo Nah and changing her identity to "Wave" when the Legion went on the run. Saturn Queen married Matter-Eater Lad and reformed after retrieving her family's hypno-stone from Prince Evillo, ultimately becoming queen of Titan. Radiation Roy, however, was kidnapped by the Dominator-controlled Earthgov and almost mindwiped as a soldier for the Dominion. These events were all wiped out by Zero Hour.

The Lightning Saga
Manifestations of the LSV based on the nightmares of Dream Girl appeared at the end of Justice Society of America vol. 3 #4 (2007), where they kill the guards of Arkham Asylum.

Superman and the Legion of Super-Heroes
In Action Comics #859 (2008), Spider Girl and Radiation Roy are shown to be members of the xenophobic Justice League of Earth, along with other rejected Legion of Super-Heroes applicants Earth Man (formerly Absorbency Boy), Eyeful Ethel, Tusker, Golden Boy, and Storm Boy. Spider Girl is now in a relationship with Earth-Man, the League's leader, and traded the Legionnaire White Witch to Mordru, in return for his staying off the planet. Roy now has to wear a containment suit, since his radioactive powers have caused him to develop tumors all over his body, specifically one dominating the right side of his face. Defeated by Superman and the Legionnaires, the Justice Leaguers are sent to the prison planet Takron-Galtos.

Final Crisis: Legion of Three Worlds

The Legion of Super-Villains appear in the Final Crisis: Legion of 3 Worlds miniseries which runs from August 2008 to September 2009. This incarnation of the Legion includes Lightning Lord, Saturn Queen, Cosmic King, Sun Emperor, Beauty Blaze, Ol-Vir, Tyr, Zymyr, Hunter, and Chameleon Chief as well as other Legion of Super-Heroes villains Black Mace, Universo, Dr. Regulus, Grimbor the Chainsman, Mordru, Esper Lass, Magno Lad, Micro Lad, Echo, Terrus, the League of Super-Assassins (Silver Slasher, Lazon, Neutrax, Mist Master, and Titania), the Fatal Five (Tharok, Emerald Empress, Persuader, Mano, and Validus), and the Justice League of Earth (Radiation Roy, Tusker, Spider Girl, Golden Boy, Storm Boy, and Earth-Man). In addition, the group is led by Superboy-Prime. The villains are broken out of Takron-Galtos by Superboy-Prime, and reveal to him that it was he who inspired them to band together.

Each member is later given copies of the Legion of Super-Heroes' flight rings bearing Prime's "S" symbol. The Legion of Super-Villains later appear on Sorcerer's World as Mordru is trying to stop Dawnstar, Wildfire, Blok, and Green Lantern/Legionnaire Rond Vidar from rescuing the White Witch. The White Witch manages to create a stargate, but Rond forces them through and is left to fight the Legion by himself. After Vidar has fought off several Legion members, Saturn Queen gets inside his head and starts to hinder his willpower. When Prime grabs Rond by the neck, Saturn Queen tells him to wait, since Rond is Universo's son. Universo shows no care for Rond and only wants his power ring. Rond mocks him, telling him it can never be his, and spits in his face before Prime snaps his neck. Universo tries to take his ring, but it flies off to Oa. Mordru is then offered membership in the Legion, telling him it can only be temporary, which is the same case for the Fatal Five and the Justice League of Earth. Earth Man sums it up by saying that, as much as the various villains dislike each other, they all want the Legion of Super-Heroes dead. They head for Earth and launch an attack on the Legionnaires. Eventually, the tide turns against them as the White Witch uses Mordru's spell "Aufero magus infusco!" three times to absorb Mordru and his magic.

Post-Legion of Three Worlds
In Adventure Comics vol. 2 #3 (2009), it was revealed that the Legion of Super-Villains has sent an espionage squad back into the 21st century.

It has also been revealed that Saturn Queen has been reforming the group in order to bring anarchy back to the universe, starting with the destruction of the worlds that house the immortal beings that represent will (Oa), faith (the Rock of Eternity), and wisdom (Utopia, the World of the Wise, homeworld of supporting character Harmonia Li).

Roster
The members of the Legion included:
 Akka - Expert martial artist from the planet Sklar, killed by Saturn Queen in issue #14.
 Beauty Blaze - Possesses heat- and fire-based abilities.
 Chameleon Chief (Jall Tannuz) - Powers similar to, but not exactly like, Chameleon Boy.
 Cosmic King (Laevar Bolto of Venus) - Transmutation powers similar to Element Lad.
 Echo (Myke-4 Astor of Calish Aetia) - Sound and sonic-based abilities.
 Esper Lass (Meta Ulnoor of Titan) - Telepathic powers similar to Saturn Girl.
 Hunter (Adam Orion of Simballi) - Son of the original Hunter, he seeks revenge on the Legion for his father's death.
 Immortus - A living brain implanted in a powerful android body.
 Lightning Lord (Mekt Ranzz of Winath) - A Winathian with lightning powers who is Lightning Lad and Light Lass' brother.
 Magno Lad (Kort Grezz of Braal) - Magnetic abilities similar to Cosmic Boy.
 Micro Lad (Lalo Muldron of Imsk) - Can shrink in size like Shrinking Violet. Killed by Akka.
 Nemesis Kid (Hart Druiter of Myar) - Can adapt the power to defeat any single enemy. Killed by Projectra.
 Ol-Vir - Daxamite powers similar to Mon-El, but lacking the former's immunity to lead.
 Questor (Xart Prax of Colu) - Technologically amplified super-genius.
 Radiation Roy (Roy Travich of Earth) - He emits radiation.
 Ron-Karr - Neptunian who can become flat.
 Saturn Queen (Eve Aries of Titan) - Time travelling telepath from the future.
 Spider Girl (Sussa Paka of Earth) - Has super-strong prehensile hair.
 Sun Emperor (Nigal Douglous of Earth) - Has solar powers similar to Sun Boy.
 Sun Killer (Kodama of Earth) - Possesses the powers of a star.
 Terrus - Ground-based abilities. Body made up of a swarm of insects.
 Tyr - Warrior from the planet Tyrraz with a bionic gun in place of his right arm.
 Zymyr - A native of the planet Gil'Dishpan who can create warps. Killed by Superboy-Prime.

The remaining villains are members of the League of Super-Assassins:

 Lazon - He can turn into light.
 Mist Master - He can turn into any vapor or gas.
 Neutrax - In addition to neutralizing the powers of anyone for a short time, he rides in a flying chair that is similar to the one used by Metron.
 Silver Slasher - She has a metallic-enhanced body and sharp nails.
 Titania - A super-strong female who is Silver Slasher's cousin.

The following joined up with the group during the Final Crisis storyline:

 Black Mace (Mick Yardreigh of Earth) - A highly trained and super-strong mercenary.
 Doctor Regulus (Zaxton Regulus of Earth) - A mad scientist.
 The Fatal Five - A group consisting of five of the greatest criminals in the universe.
 Emerald Empress - A female villain who controlled the Emerald Eye of Ekron.
 Mano - A villain whose right hand has an anti-matter touch.
 Persuader - A villain who wields an atomic axe that can cut through anything.
 Tharok - A villain who became a cyborg after losing the left side of his body in an accident.
 Validus - An alien monster with super-strength, enhanced durability, energy projection, and an immunity to telepathy.
 Grimbor the Chainsman - A master craftsman and expert trap master.
 The Justice League of Earth - A group of Legion of Super-Heroes rejects that tried to save Earth by turning it into a xenophobic society.
 Earth-Man - He can absorb and duplicate the abilities of metahumans and aliens alike.
 Golden Boy (Klint Stewirt of Earth) - He can change the structure of any element into gold just by touching them.
 Storm Boy (Myke Chypurz of Earth) - He can control the weather.
 Tusker (Horace Lafeaugh of Earth) - He has ivory-like tusks that can grow to certain sizes as well as enhanced durability, a healing factor, and enhanced strength, agility, and reflexes.
 Mordru - A powerful wizard.
 Superboy-Prime - A version of Superboy from Earth-Prime.
 Universo - An ex-Green Lantern Corps member with hypnotic abilities.

In other media
The Legion of Super-Villains appeared in the Legion of Super Heroes episode "Lightning Storm". The lineup consists of Lightning Lord (voiced by James Arnold Taylor), Hunter (voiced by Khary Payton), Esper (voiced by Tara Strong), Tyr (voiced by Khary Payton), Wave, and Ron-Karr (voiced by Shawn Harrison with the character depicted as a shapeshifter). This version is primarily led by Lightning Lord. Calling themselves the "Light Speed Vanguard" they pretend to be superheroes and attempt to outperform the Legion of Super-Heroes. They are soon revealed to be financially motivated protector-extortionists and assassins. The team, minus Lightning Lord, return at the beginning of Season 2 assisting the Fatal Five. Now led exclusively by Tyr in the absence of Lightning Lord, they appear as one of several teams of villains released from prison by Imperiex. In that same episode, Brainiac 5 later refers to them officially as the Legion of Super-Villains.

References

External links
 Cosmic Teams profile
 Dragon Hero.com profile
 Incarnations of the Legion of Super-Villains
 Superman #147 (debut of Legion of Super-Villains)
 Unofficial Legion of Super-Villains biography

Legion of Super-Heroes
Comics characters introduced in 1968
Comics about time travel
DC Comics supervillain teams